The 2013–14 Nevada Wolf Pack men's basketball team represented the University of Nevada, Reno during the 2013–14 NCAA Division I men's basketball season. The Wolf Pack, led by fifth year head coach David Carter, played their home games at the Lawlor Events Center and were members of the Mountain West Conference. They finished the season 15–17, 10–8 in Mountain West play to finish in a tie for third place. They lost in the quarterfinals of the Mountain West tournament to Boise State.

Departures

Recruiting

Roster

Schedule

|-
!colspan=9 style="background:#002E62; color:#C8C9CB;"| Exhibition

|-
!colspan=9 style="background:#002E62; color:#C8C9CB;"| Regular season

|-
!colspan=9 style="background:#002E62; color:#C8C9CB;"| Mountain West tournament

References

Nevada Wolf Pack men's basketball seasons
Nevada
Nevada Wolf Pack
Nevada Wolf Pack